Protopteraspididae is an extinct family of pteraspidid heterostracan agnathans. Fossils of the various genera are found in early Devonian-aged marine strata.  Protopteraspidids were once thought to represent a taxon of basal pteraspidids (hence "proto") but recent evaluations demonstrate that Protopteraspididae is a paraphyletic group of various transitional forms representing a gradual transition between the more advanced Pteraspoidei (comprising Pteraspididae, Gigantaspis and Protaspididae), and the anchipteraspidids and the Psammosteids.

Genera
Protopteraspids are found in Lower Devonian marine strata of the Western United States, Northern Canada, England, France, Belgium, Svalbard, Norway, and Podolia, Ukraine.

Protopteraspis 
This genus is known from several species from Lower Devonian England, France and Belgium

Doryaspis 
This is a genus of aberrant pteraspidids with lower lips elongated into long, dagger-like organs of unknown function.  The various species are primarily restricted to the Lower Devonian strata of Svalbard.

Escharaspis

Miltaspis

Stegobranchiaspis

Unarkaspis

"Trygonaspis" 
"Trygonaspis" is a nomen nudum given to a beautifully preserved complete armor that strongly resembles Protopteraspis in form, but with a long, recurved dorsal spine, and orbital plates that have bookshelf-like extensions.  The only known specimen was found in Northern Canada.

References

 Palaeos Vertebrates entry on order Pteraspidiformes

Pteraspidiformes
Devonian jawless fish
Early Devonian fish
Prehistoric jawless fish families
Early Devonian first appearances
Early Devonian extinctions